The 2022–2023 mpox outbreak in the United States is part of the larger outbreak of human mpox caused by the West African clade of the monkeypox virus. The United States was the fourth country outside of the African countries with endemic mpox, to experience an outbreak in 2022. The first case was documented in Boston, Massachusetts, on May 17, 2022. As of August 22, mpox has spread to all 50 states in the United States, as well as Washington, D.C., and Puerto Rico. The United States has the highest number of mpox cases in the world. California has the highest number of mpox cases in the United States.

On August 4, 2022, the U.S. Centers for Disease Control and Prevention declared mpox a public health emergency in the United States. Wyoming was the last and most recent state in the United States to report at least one mpox case.
On August 30, 2022, the first mpox death in the United States was reported.

Background 

An ongoing outbreak of mpox was confirmed on May 6, 2022, beginning with a British resident who, after travelling to Nigeria (where the disease is endemic), presented symptoms consistent with mpox on April 29, 2022. The resident returned to the United Kingdom on May 4, creating the country's index case of the outbreak. The origin of several of the cases of mpox in the United Kingdom is unknown. Some monitors saw community transmission taking place in the London area as of mid-May, but it has been suggested that cases were already spreading in Europe in the previous months.

Transmission 

A large portion of those infected were believed to have not recently traveled to areas of Africa where mpox is normally found, such as Nigeria, the Democratic Republic of the Congo as well as central and western Africa. It is believed to be transmitted by close contact with sick people, with extra caution for those individuals with lesions on their skin or genitals, along with their bedding and clothing. The CDC has also stated that individuals should avoid contact and consumption of dead animals such as rats, squirrels, monkeys, and apes along with wild game or lotions derived from animals in Africa.

In addition to more common symptoms, such as fever, headache, swollen lymph nodes, and rashes or lesions, some patients have also experienced proctitis, an inflammation of the rectum lining. CDC has also warned clinicians to not rule out mpox in patients with sexually transmitted infections since there have been reports of co-infections with syphilis, gonorrhea, chlamydia, and herpes.

The CDC has stated that, among mpox cases with available data, 99% occurred in men, 94% of whom reported recent male-to-male sexual or close intimate contact.

Cases transited through the United States

California 
The 2022–2023 mpox outbreak in California. As of July 2022, the virus has infected 4,886 people in the U.S. state of California, with 1 death. The state has the highest number of recorded cases in the country.

Florida 
Florida currently has 2,444 people infected by the virus, with no deaths. It started on May 23, 2022 in Fort Lauderdale and quickly started spreading across the State.

New York 

The 2022–2023 mpox outbreak in New York currently has no deaths. This state has the second highest number of recorded cases in the country with 3,679 cases.

Timeline 

The first known case was detected on May 18, 2022, in a man from Boston, Massachusetts, who had traveled to Canada, where a case of the virus was reported the following day. The person was hospitalized in Boston. There, he tested positive for mpox, becoming the first case in the United States.

Two days after the man tested positive for the virus, other states began reporting cases, with New York reporting its first case on May 21. On May 22, President Biden gave a speech at Osan Air Base in South Korea during which he indicated the disease was "something that everybody should be concerned about". On May 26, Virginia reported its first case in a woman who had traveled to Africa, followed by California and Hawaii on June 4, 2022. As of June 3, the United States had 21 confirmed cases, a number which had risen to 460 as of July 1.

On May 23, 2022, Florida reported a case of mpox. On the same day, the Tampa Bay Times reported that the Florida Department of Health had announced the case on a man that had been isolated since the day before. WESH later on also confirmed the case, which was in Broward County. The following day, WESH reported another mpox case as being "investigated". The case was then confirmed to be in the same county as the first case, adding up the total in the county to two. Later, a third case was also investigated, this time being reported by CBS Miami to also be in the same county as the first and second case. This case added up the total in the United States to 18. A fourth case was reported by the Sun-Sentinel, although the state of Florida did not disclose the county where it was detected.

In early June 2022, a man in Washington, D.C., was reported to test positive for orthopox, potentially mpox.

On July 26, 2022, the United States had more mpox cases than any other country. At the end of August 2022, there were early signs that the mpox spread in the U.S. may be slowing.

Ref: 
 FRA: 2022–2023 mpox outbreak in France#Cases, rev. 8 Oct. 2022 
 GER: 2022–2023 mpox outbreak in Germany#Cumulative number of cases, rev. 8 Oct. 2022

Cases by state
Data sourced from the CDC

Timeline of first confirmed cases by state

Timeline of first deaths by state 
As Of January 4, 2023 there have been 20 mpox-related deaths reported in the US.

Responses

Vaccination 
On 18 May 2022, Bavarian Nordic announced that BARDA, part of the Department of Health and Human Services (HHS), exercised a $119 million option, under a $299 million contract, to supply a freeze-dried version of JYNNEOS vaccine, converting existing bulk vaccine. The United States spent $119 million to purchase doses of the Modified vaccinia Ankara-based two-shot Jynneos vaccine from Bavarian Nordic in May 2022. The contract also allows the United States to purchase an additional $180 million worth of the vaccine at a later date. The vaccine, JYNNEOS (also known by the brand names Imvamune and Imvanex), was approved by FDA in 2019 to prevent both smallpox and mpox. As of June 14, the United States had around 70,000 doses of JYNNEOS in its stockpile, and the federal government placed an order for 500,000 more on June 10, 2022. Dawn O'Connell, assistant secretary for preparedness and response at Department of Health and Human Services (HHS), said around 300,000 doses would be delivered in June–July 2022, and the remainder would be delivered later in that year.

In addition, the Strategic National Stockpile (SNS) holds over 100 million doses of an older smallpox vaccine (ACAM2000).

As of June 28, the Biden administration was allocating tens of thousands of vaccine doses from the Strategic National Stockpile to clinics nation-wide. The rollout of vaccines and testing was criticized as too slow, as well as for having similar problems to the rollout of vaccines and tests during the COVID-19 pandemic in the United States.

The United States government's response is coordinated by the National Security Council Directorate on Global Health Security and Biodefense – more commonly known as the White House Pandemic Office – in collaboration with the Department of Health and Human Services (HHS). The White House Pandemic Office had previously reinstated Dr. Beth Cameron to the executive position. The HHS is overseen by Secretary of Health and Human Services Xavier Becerra.

As of June 29, HHS has received requests from 32 states and jurisdictions, deploying over 9,000 doses of JYNNEOS vaccine and 300 courses of ST-246 (tecovirimat) antiviral smallpox treatments. The United States expanded deployment of JYNNEOS vaccines, allocating 296,000 doses over the coming weeks, 56,000 of which will be allocated immediately. Over the coming months a combined 2.5 million additional doses will become available.
As of November 2022, New York state ended its state of emergency, mobile mass vaccination sites set up since summer in New York city closed, but vaccinations were moved to outpatient and sexual health clinics.

Precautionary measures 
Hospitals have begun making their own preparations to help control the current mpox outbreak, including screening patients, increasing decontamination and cleaning procedures, and wearing appropriate safety gear when interacting with infected patients.

See also
 2003 Midwest monkeypox outbreak
 2022–2023 mpox outbreak in Brazil
 2022–2023 mpox outbreak in Canada
 2022–2023 mpox outbreak in India
 2022–2023 mpox outbreak in Japan
 2022–2023 mpox outbreak in New York (state)
 COVID-19 pandemic in the United States
 Smallpox vaccine
 Timeline of the 2022–2023 mpox outbreak

Notes

External links
 CDC data:
 2022 U.S. Map & Case Count (www.cdc.gov)
 Archive of "2022 Outbreak Cases and Data" on the Wayback Machine

References

External links

 Centers for Disease Control page about mpox
 The Johns Hopkins Center for Health Security, Monkeypox Fact Sheet

United States
Mpox
Mpox
LGBT history in the United States